Austronomus, known as Australasian free-tailed bats, is a molossid genus of microchiropterans.  The two recognised species are the white-striped Austronomus australis, found in a wide distribution range across Australia, and the New Guinea species Austronomus kuboriensis.

The genus name was first proposed by Tom Iredale and Ellis Troughton in 1934, but this lacked a formal description until Troughton included one in his Furred animals of Australia (1944). The type species of the genus is Molossus australis Gray, 1838. The Australasian populations have also been allied to Tadarida, a genus of widely distributed freetail bats.

References 

 
Bat genera